The 2022 Patriot League baseball tournament will take place on consecutive weekends, with the semifinals held May 14–15 and the finals May 24–26.  The higher seeded teams will host each best of three series.  The winner will earn the conference's automatic bid to the 2022 NCAA Division I baseball tournament.

Seeding
The top four finishers from the regular season are seeded one through four, with the top seed hosting the fourth seed and second seed hosting the third.  The visiting team will be designated as the home team in the second game of each series.

Results

References

Tournament
Patriot League Baseball Tournament
Patriot League baseball tournament